Kulno Süvalep (until 1934 Schulbach; 4 August 1929 Tallinn – 19 July 1996 Tartu) was an Estonian theatre director, actor, poet, translator, and songwriter.

Süvalep was the son of politician and journalist Arnold Paul Schulbach. In 1951 he graduated from Estonian State Theatre Institute. 1952-1954 he was director's assistant and actor at Estonian Drama Theatre. 1954-1961 he was principal stage manager at Rakvere Theatre. 1961-1989 he was an actor and director at Vanemuine Theatre.

Awards:
 1977: Estonian SSR merited art personnel
 1996: Aleksander Kurtna's translation prize

Theatre roles

Director's works

 Simukov's "Tütarlapsed, kaunitarid" (1952)
 Ostrovski's "Balzaminovi abiellumine" (1953)
 Luts' ja H. Luik's "Kevade" (1954, with K. Kiisk)

References

1929 births
1996 deaths
Estonian theatre directors
Estonian male stage actors
20th-century Estonian male actors
Estonian dramatists and playwrights
Estonian male poets
20th-century Estonian poets
Estonian songwriters
Writers from Tallinn
People from Tallinn